Cheung Sai Ho (27 August 1975 – 22 April 2011) was a Hong Kong professional footballer.

International career
In the 1993 Gothia Cup, at the age of 18, Cheung scored the then fastest ever goal on record (2.8 seconds).

Cheung played his last game for Hong Kong during the 2010 FIFA World Cup qualification in 2007, where he helped Hong Kong to defeat East Timor 2–3 away and 8–1 at home to advance to the next round. He officially announced his retirement from professional football in July 2008.

Death
On 22 April 2011, Cheung committed suicide at the age of 35 by jumping from his home in Tin Heng Estate. The police reported that he was having a dispute with his wife over money and love before the incident.

References

External links

1975 births
2011 deaths
Association football midfielders
Expatriate footballers in Macau
G.D. Lam Pak players
South China AA players
Happy Valley AA players
Hong Kong First Division League players
Hong Kong footballers
Hong Kong international footballers
Suicides by jumping in Hong Kong
Hong Kong League XI representative players
2011 suicides
Footballers at the 1998 Asian Games
Asian Games competitors for Hong Kong